is a Japanese judoka. He was two times world champion of Half-middleweight category.

He is from Miyako, Iwate. He began judo at the age of a 6th grader. After graduation from Kokushikan University, He belonged to Iwate Prefectural Police.

He won the gold medal of world championships in 1983 and 1985. He participate All-Japan Championships 6 times and won the bronze medal in 1982.

He tried by the supervision of all-Japan women's team at 2005 World Championships and 2008 Summer Olympics.

References

External links
 

Japanese male judoka
People from Iwate Prefecture
1956 births
Living people
20th-century Japanese people
21st-century Japanese people